Cortez High School is located in Phoenix, Arizona at 8828 N 31st Ave, Phoenix, AZ 85051. It is part of the Glendale Union High School District. The mascot is the Colt and the school colors are primarily black and white with red used as an alternate color. It has been continuously listed on U.S. News & World Report's Best High School Ranking list.

History 
Cortez was designed by the local architecture firm of Edward L. Varney Associates. Construction of the campus was undertaken by Harmon-Davis Construction Co.

Athletics

Cortez High School participates in 13 different sports as a member of the Arizona Interscholastic Association's 4A Conference.

Notable alumni
 Brian Davis – American football player
 Duffy Dyer – former MLB player (New York Mets, Pittsburgh Pirates, Montreal Expos, Detroit Tigers)
 Kevin Wickander – former MLB player (Cleveland Indians, Cincinnati Reds, Milwaukee Brewers, Detroit Tigers)
 Vincent Furnier, better known as Alice Cooper – musician
 Dennis Dunaway and Glen Buxton – formed the band 'The Earwigs' (with Vince Furnier) while at Cortez and were original members of the Alice Cooper band
 Greg Stanton – elected mayor of Phoenix on November 8, 2011
 Dennis Gile – American football player
 Bill Brotherton – former Arizona State Senator
 Paul Penzone – elected sheriff of Maricopa County on January 1, 2017
 Sean Bonnette – lead singer of folk punk band AJJ

References

External links
 Cortez High School

Education in Glendale, Arizona
Educational institutions established in 1960
1960 establishments in Arizona
Public high schools in Arizona